In functional analysis, a topological vector space (TVS) is said to be quasi-complete or boundedly complete if every closed and bounded subset is complete. 
This concept is of considerable importance for non-metrizable TVSs.

Properties 

 Every quasi-complete TVS is sequentially complete.
 In a quasi-complete locally convex space, the closure of the convex hull of a compact subset is again compact.  
 In a quasi-complete Hausdorff TVS, every precompact subset is relatively compact. 
 Every quasi-complete infrabarrelled space is barreled. 
 If  is a quasi-complete locally convex space then every weakly bounded subset of the continuous dual space is strongly bounded.
 A quasi-complete nuclear space then  has the Heine–Borel property.

Examples and sufficient conditions 

Every complete TVS is quasi-complete.  
The product of any collection of quasi-complete spaces is again quasi-complete.  
The projective limit of any collection of quasi-complete spaces is again quasi-complete.  
Every semi-reflexive space is quasi-complete.  

The quotient of a quasi-complete space by a closed vector subspace may fail to be quasi-complete.

Counter-examples 

There exists an LB-space that is not quasi-complete.

See also

References

Bibliography

  
  
  
  
  
  

Functional analysis